Ochs or OCHS may refer to:

People
 Ochs (surname)

Geography
 Kleines Fiescherhorn, a mountain peak of the Bernese Alps near Grindelwald, Switzerland, also named Ochs

OCHS may refer to:
 Oaks Christian High School
 Oakland Charter High School, a member school of Amethod Public Schools
 Ocean City High School
 Oregon City High School
 Oxford Centre for Hindu Studies
 Oconee County High School
 Oman College of Health Since